Presidential elections were held in Equatorial Guinea on 25 February 1996. Although the country was no longer a one-party state, the elections were boycotted by the opposition, although their names remained on the ballot papers. As a result, the incumbent Teodoro Obiang Nguema Mbasogo won with 97.85% of votes. Turnout was 79.8%.

Results

The official results had a total of 183,830 voters.

References

Equatorial Guinea
Presidential
Presidential elections in Equatorial Guinea
Single-candidate elections